The bee subfamily Panurginae is a diverse lineage of 33 genera in 7 tribes. They are particularly diverse in the New World, though scarce in the tropics, and in the Old World they can be found primarily in the Palaearctic and Africa, but absent from Australia and tropical Asia. They tend to be associated with xeric or sandy habitats.

The "facial foveae" of Panurgines are not broad, velvety depressions as in Andreninae, but reduced to grooves or pits at the upper margin of the eyes. The apex of the marginal cell of the wing is truncate, and the trochanteral scopa is reduced. Panurgines also frequently have yellow markings in locations other than on the face, a feature not seen in any other subfamilies of Andrenidae.

Most members of this subfamily are oligolectic, with highly specialized floral associations, especially in desert species.

Systematics
 Tribe Protandrenini
 Anthemurgus
 Anthrenoides
 Chaeturginus
 Liphanthus
 Neffapis
 Parapsaenythia
 Protandrena
 Psaenythia
 Pseudopanurgus
 Rhophitulus
 Tribe Panurgini
 Avpanurgus
 Camptopoeum
 Panurginus
 Panurgus
 Tribe Nolanomelissini
 Nolanomelissa
 Tribe Melitturgini
 Belliturgula
 Borgatomelissa
 Flavomeliturgula
 Gasparinahla
 Khuzimelissa
 Melitturga
 Meliturgula
 Mermiglossa
 Plesiopanurgus
 Tribe Protomeliturgini
 Protomeliturga
 Tribe Perditini
 Macrotera
 Perdita

 Tribe Calliopsini
 Acamptopoeum
 Arhysosage
 Calliopsis
 Callonychium
 Litocalliopsis
 Spinoliella
 Xeranthrena

References 

C. D. Michener (2007) The Bees of the World, 2nd Edition, Johns Hopkins University Press.

Andrenidae
Apocrita subfamilies